Calosoma diminutum is a species of ground beetle in the subfamily of Carabinae. It was described by Henry Walter Bates in 1891.

References

Diminutum
Beetles described in 1891